Paralaxita  is a genus in the butterfly family Riodinidae present only in Southeast Asia.

Species
Lamas, 2008 recognizes the species:

 Paralaxita damajanti (Felder, C & R. Felder, 1860)
 Paralaxita hewitsoni (Röber, 1895)
 Paralaxita orphna (Boisduval, 1836)
 Paralaxita telesia (Hewitson, 1861)

References

External links
Paralaxita - funet

Riodinidae
Butterfly genera